The World Group was the highest level of Davis Cup competition in 2009. The first-round losers went into the Davis Cup World Group Play-offs, and the winners progress to the quarterfinals. The quarterfinalists were guaranteed a World Group spot for 2010.

Participating Teams

Draw

First round

Argentina vs. Netherlands

Czech Republic vs. France

United States vs. Switzerland

Croatia vs. Chile

Sweden vs. Israel

Controversy and riots

Sweden attracted controversy when they forbade fans from seeing the matches inside the Baltic Hall, fearing anti-Israeli violence. Several Swedish politicians, including the mayor of Malmö and the head of the Green Party, said that they wanted to cancel the match instead of having an Israeli team play in the city, but after it was strongly pointed out that Sweden would suffer a forfeit loss and immediate elimination from the Cup tournament, the prospect of a cancellation was nixed. A proposal to move the matches to Stockholm fell through because of limited preparation time. Israeli player Andy Ram condemned the switch, calling it a "stupid decision". In the end, anti-Israel protesters rioted outside the stadium while the Swedish team was stunned when Israel defeated them.

The Davis Cup fined the Swedish tennis federation $25,000 and ordered them to pay an additional $15,000 in what would have been gate receipts. The city of Malmö was also banned from hosting Davis Cup matches for the next five years, and Sweden will lose its choice of venue if it happens again, being required to guarantee that future matches will be open to the public.

Romania vs. Russia

Germany vs. Austria

Spain vs. Serbia

Quarterfinals

Czech Republic vs. Argentina

Croatia vs. United States

Israel vs. Russia

Spain vs. Germany

Semifinals

Croatia vs. Czech Republic

Spain vs. Israel

Final

Spain vs. Czech Republic

References

World Group
Davis Cup World Group